Pachypappa is a genus of true bugs belonging to the family Aphididae.

The species of this genus are found in Europe and Northern America.

Species:
 Pachypappa aigeros Zhang & Guangxue, 1997 
 Pachypappa marsupialis Koch, 1856

References

Aphididae